John McClamrock (March 24, 1956 – March 18, 2008) was a Dallas high school American football player who received media attention and sympathy from many Americans after an accident that left him with near-total paralysis in 1973.

Background
McClamrock, a resident of Preston Hollow, attended Hillcrest High School. On October 17, 1973, an accident during a football game led to a severe injury in which he was paralyzed from the neck down. Hundreds of Hillcrest students visited him at Presbyterian Hospital following his injury. Various Dallas-area schools held benefit games in honor of McClamrock. Local newspapers covered McClamrock's story. The owner of the area Bonanza Steakhouse chain held a "Johnny McClamrock Day" in which 10% of sales were given to a medical fund. Hillcrest High School held numerous benefit events in his honor. McClamrock received get-well cards from people across the United States. President Richard Nixon sent McClamrock a condolence letter. For the rest of his life, McClamrock's mother, Ann Logan "Pretty Annie" McClamrock, cared for him. McClamrock, with assistance from family members and tutors, graduated from high school in 1975. He lived in the same neighborhood for the remainder of his life, under the care of his mother Ann. His condition prevented him from being placed in an upright position. Later in his life, new, wealthier residents who moved into the area and replaced people who knew McClamrock were initially unaware of McClamrock's presence and story.

Death and aftermath
McClamrock died from respiratory issues at Kindred Hospital in Dallas on March 18, 2008. Ann died May 13, 2008, at the age of 89. McClamrock's brother, Henry, said that his mother decided that "her job was finished." In November 2010 Ann was named the Youth Sports Hero of the Month by Douglas E. Abrams on the website MomsTeam.com.

In June 2011 the Dallas Independent School District (DISD) board voted against renaming the Franklin Stadium at Hillcrest after John McClamrock.

Television and film
The 1976 Six Million Dollar Man episode "The Bionic Boy", about an injured young athlete who receives bionic implants, is a reference and tribute to John McClamrock, who had been prominently in the news during that period.

On May 8, 2010, the NFL Network aired a feature called A Still Life on John and his mother Ann McClamrock for their NFL Total Access: Week in Review television show. Billy Bob Thornton narrated.

It has been announced that George Robinson will play John in the film Still Life, based on the Texas Monthly non-fiction article of the same name written by Skip Hollandsworth in 2009, about John and his mother Ann.

References

1956 births
2008 deaths
Deaths from respiratory failure
Hillcrest High School (Dallas) alumni
People with tetraplegia
Players of American football from Dallas